The 2011 WNBL Finals was the postseason tournament of the WNBL's 2010–11 season. The Canberra Capitals were the two-time defending champions, but were defeated in the Grand Final by the Bulleen Boomers.

Standings

Bracket

Elimination final

(4) Dandenong Rangers vs. (5) Logan Thunder

Semi-finals

(1) Bulleen Boomers vs. (2) Canberra Capitals

(3) Bendigo Spirit vs. (5) Logan Thunder

Preliminary final

(2) Canberra Capitals vs. (3) Bendigo Spirit

Grand Final

(1) Bulleen Boomers vs. (2) Canberra Capitals

Rosters

References 

2011 Finals
2010-11
Women's National Basketball League Finals
2010–11 in Australian basketball
Aus
basketball
basketball